Cryptochetum iceryae, the cottony cushion scale parasite, is a species of scale parasite fly in the family Cryptochetidae. Originating in Australia, it was deliberately introduced to California in the 1880s in an attempt to control cottony cushion scale, and has also been introduced to Israel and South America. In 2019, the species was discovered in the United Kingdom for the first time, having been identified in the wildlife garden at the Natural History Museum.

References

Ephydroidea
Articles created by Qbugbot
Taxa named by Samuel Wendell Williston
Insects described in 1888
Cryptochetidae